Alexander Dimitry (February 7, 1805 – January 30, 1883) was a mixed race Louisiana creole.
He was the first state superintendent of public instruction in Louisiana, an author, diplomat, educator, journalist, lawyer, orator, and publicist. He spoke eleven languages. He was the first person of color to represent the United States as Ambassador to Costa Rica and Nicaragua. He was also one of the few people of color to serve in the bureaucracy of the Confederate Government. He was the first person of color to attend Georgetown University.

Family

Alexander Dimitry was born in New Orleans, February 7, 1805, to merchant Andrea Dimitry (1775–1852) and Marianne Céleste Dragon (1777–1856). His Greek father immigrated to New Orleans in the spring of 1799, and fought in the War of 1812, serving in the Battle of New Orleans with Major General and future President Andrew Jackson.

On Dimitry's mother's side, his maternal grandfather Michel or Miguel Dragon was also a Greek immigrant to Louisiana and a veteran of the American Revolution, having served under Bernardo de Galvez. His maternal grandmother Françoise Monplaisir was born to an enslaved mulatto woman in New Orleans and baptized in 1755. Their daughter and Dimitry's mother Marianne Céleste Dragon was born free, although Dragon and Monplaisir did not marry until 1815. Marianne Céleste Dragon's 1777 baptismal record identifies her as a free pardo, but she was identified as white upon her marriage to Andrea Dimitry in 1799. The Roman Catholic ceremony was performed by Antonio de Sedella. A portrait of Marianne Céleste Dragon is believed to have been painted by José Salazar, an itinerant Mexican painter who immigrated to New Orleans in the mid-1780s.

Alexander was one of ten children. His brothers and sisters included: Euphrosine, Mannella Airnée, Constantine Andrea, John Baptiste Miguel Dracos, Clino Angelica, Marie Francesca Athenais, Nicholas Dimitry, Mathilde Elizabeth Theophainie, and Antonie Marie.

Education

By the age of ten, he was educated by private tutors, Dimitry was fluent in classical Greek and Latin. He spoke English, French, Greek, Italian, and Spanish. At fifteen years old Alexander entered Georgetown University in Washington, D. C., he graduated in 1826. When he returned to New Orleans he studied law under Auguste Davezac and James Workman. He was also a student of Christian Roselius.

Alexander Dimitry took the bar examination and entered law as a profession. He was knowledgeable in Roman, English, and French law and immediately obtained a reputable position. Regrettably, he was more interested in education, literature, and languages. He became a professor at the College of Baton Rouge. He returned to New Orleans after two years and was one of the owners and editors of L'Abeille, a French newspaper. He was the first editor of the English side of the paper.

Career
Alexander frequently traveled to Washington D.C., where he met his wife, Mary Powell Mills. Mills was the daughter of Robert Mills a distinguished architect. He was from Charleston, South Carolina, and the designer of the Washington Monument. The couple married in Washington D.C. on April 5, 1835. In 1835, Alexander became principal clerk for the Southwest postal department. He remained at this position for four years.

The U.S. Congress appointed Dimitry secretary of the commission sent to Mexico to settle disputes. His knowledge of the Spanish language and international law made him a valuable member of the commission. When he returned to Louisiana he established the college of Saint Charles Parish. He was dean of the College. Dimitry then became superintendent of the schools of New Orleans. Around this time, Alexander educated prominent creole American author, poet, and translator Mary Bushnell Williams.

Isaac Johnson Governor of Louisiana appointed Dimitry state superintendent of public education. Dimitry was the first person of color and the first incumbent of the office in Louisiana. The office organized the public school system throughout the state. He held this position from 1847 to 1854

In 1853, Dimitry's nephew George Pandelly ran for a seat on the Board of Assistant Aldermen, a municipal body responsible for urban infrastructure in New Orleans including streets and sidewalks. George Wiltz seized on Pandelly's mixed race ancestry to discredit his election, prompting Pandelly to take his opponent to court for slander. The case was dismissed, but the "Pandelly Affair" inspired later generations to invent a new genealogy for themselves in which they claimed descent from a mythical, possibly invented Indian princess of the Alibamu tribe named Malanta Talla.

After his service as superintendent Alexander was called to Washington by William L. Marcy. He was Secretary of State under President Franklin Pierce. Alexander was appointed to a commission to revise some treaties with American Indian Tribes. In 1855, he was appointed by the U.S. Department of State to translate diplomatic correspondences with different foreign governments. He was fluent in eleven languages. While he was at the State Department he lectured at Georgetown University.

President Buchanan appointed him United States minister resident of Costa Rica and Nicaragua in 1859. He was hired to settle diplomatic disputes. Alexander was crucial because he spoke the native languages fluently. He made important speeches in Spanish at diplomatic functions. He was very knowledgeable about the conditions of Central America. Alexander was about to obtain a treaty with Nicaragua. Because of the secession of South Carolina, the negotiation ended. Louisiana also passed an ordinance of secession.

Dimitry, concerned about his huge family in New Orleans and his state resigned from his position as Ambassador. Secretary of State William H. Seward expressed President Abraham Lincoln's discontent with Alexander's decision when he returned to Washington. Alexander turned down a yearly salary of $12,000 in gold. Alexander's son John Dimitry was also a Greek-American creole. He was extremely educated and worked with his father as the Secretary of Legation of Costa Rica and Nicaragua.

Civil War

Alexander Dimitry's son John Dimitry served as a private in Captain George Graham's company which afterward became Company C and the color company of the Crescent City Native Guards. He was one of the colored guard. 

During the American Civil War Alexander traveled to Richmond Virginia where he served as chief clerk to the Postmaster General. He later became Assistant Postmaster General of the Confederacy. The Postmaster was John Henninger Reagan. His son John was wounded and later rejoined his father at the Postmaster's office. His other son Alexander Godgrand Dimitry died in the American Civil War. He lost his life in battle near Germantown, Maryland. He was part of the Eighteenth Virginia Cavalry C.S.A.

Although Dimitry had connections in the Confederate government, he did not have the respect of all his compatriots. On July 29, 1861, Dimitry asked P. G. T. Beauregard for the body of James Cameron, who was killed during the First Battle of Bull Run, so he could be buried. Dimitry signed the letter with, "Old Friend + Fellow Louisianan". Beauregard replied: "I listen to no appeal from a traitor to the land of his birth," as Dimitry had abandoned the Confederate cause.

On September 4, 1865, President Andrew Johnson issued Alexander a Presidential pardon for his participation in the American Civil War. At the end of the war the family moved to Brooklyn, New York.

Later life and death

In 1868, the family moved back to New Orleans. One year later Alexander became professor of Latin at the Christian Brothers College in Pass Christian, Mississippi. By the 1870s, Alexander Dimitry, his siblings, nephews, in-laws, and cousins comprised over 100 people in New Orleans. They were an extremely politically connected Greek-American creole family. 

His son John helped write Jefferson Davis's biography with his wife Varina Davis. In 1875, Alexander wrote an article for Le Meschacébé, a prominent Louisiana newspaper entitled The Creole Defined. He defines the word creole and outlines its significance throughout grammatical history.

Alexander spent the remainder of his life at Christian Brothers College. He continued writing articles for newspapers and lectured all over the South. He often lectured at the dedication of buildings and was a well-known scholar. His lectures included his theory on Earth's Fitness for Man, which discussed the formation of earth, light, and animals, the creation, and the relation of man to the infinite. He participated at the commencement of the Peabody Normal Seminary on several occasions. He went to commencements all over the south. He was a member of the Order of Heptasophs. He died at his home in New Orleans in 1883. Many of Dimitry's writings remain unpublished.

Alexander Dimitry and Mary Powell Mills had 10 children, Their names are in order of birth: John Bull Smith Dimitry, Charles Patton Dimitry, Eliza Virginia Mills Dimitry, Mary Elizabeth Lynn Dimitry, Alexander Godgrand Dimitry, Mathilde Fortier Dimitry, Mills Miller, Robert Mills Dimitry, Robert Andrea Dimitry, Thomas Daney Dimitry, and Ernest Alexander Lagarde Dimitry.  Alexander's creole mother Marianne Celeste Dragon has appeared in several publications.  Her portrait was on the cover of the 2009 book Exiles at Home by Shirley Elizabeth Thompson.  She was also featured in the 2013 book Behind Closed Doors Art in the Spanish American Home, 1492-1898 By Mia L. Bagneris, Michael A. Brown, Suzanne L. Stratton-Pruitt.

Literary work

See also
Andrea Dimitry
Quadroon
Homer Plessy
José Salazar
John Celivergos Zachos

References

Bibliography

External links
 Alexander Dimitry (History of the Order of AHEPA - The First Greeks in the New World pp. 17-20)

1805 births
1883 deaths
Ambassadors of the United States to Costa Rica
Ambassadors of the United States to Nicaragua
American people of Greek descent
Philodemic Society members
19th-century Greek Americans
American people of Creole descent
Louisiana Creole people
French people of Louisiana Creole descent
19th-century American politicians
Confederate States of America political leaders
People of Louisiana in the American Civil War
African Americans in the American Civil War
Georgetown University alumni
19th-century Greek scientists
19th-century Greek educators
19th-century Greek writers
19th-century Greek American writers